Hans-Dieter Roos (born 22 May 1937) is a retired German football manager.

References

1937 births
Living people
German footballers
FC Remscheid players
Association football defenders
German football managers
Eintracht Frankfurt managers
SV Eintracht Trier 05 managers
Stuttgarter Kickers managers
SpVgg Greuther Fürth managers
SpVgg Ludwigsburg managers